Rushey Mead is an area, suburb, electoral ward and administrative division of the city of Leicester, England. The population of the ward at the 2011 census was 15,962. It comprises the northern Leicester suburb of Rushey Mead in its entirety, as well as a part of the neighbouring area, suburb and electoral ward of Belgrave and historical parts of neighbouring Northfields and Thurmaston.

Geography

Rushey Mead is bounded by the wards and areas of Belgrave to the south and west and Humberstone & Hamilton and Northfields to the east and south-east on the other side of the Midland Main Line. North and north-west of Rushey Mead are the Leicestershire villages of Thurmaston and Birstall at the Leicestershire county border and in the Borough of Charnwood at the start of the Leicester Urban Area in that direction.

History
Rushey Mead was originally a part of the Thurmaston civil parish during the 19th century. The modern day suburb was split from Thurmaston and gazetted as a "Thurmaston Urban District" in 1894, before being annexed to the City of Leicester in 1935, when it was renamed Rushey Mead.

Jesse Jackson, the American politician who was twice a Democratic Party candidate for nomination in elections to be President of the United States visited Rushey Mead on 5 December 2015 to open a park named in his honour.

Business and commerce
The Mazda Lamps factory opened on Melton Road in 1946. In 1964 the factory was renamed as Thorn Lighting.

Further details concerning the history of the Mazda factory on Melton Road, Rushey Mead, Leicester

In 1946 British Thomson-Houston (BTH) opened what was, until 1964, called the Mazda Lamps factory on Melton Road, Leicester, producing electric lamps of many kinds. BTH had licensed the 'Mazda (light bulb)' brand name from General Electric of USA (GE). In 1964 the lamp factory was renamed as Thorn Lighting after the merger of Thorn Lighting with AEI. General Electric, one of the world's biggest companies, took over the Thorn Lighting company in 1991.

Earlier history
In 1928 BTH was amalgamated with its rival, the Metropolitan-Vickers company, to form Associated Electrical Industries (AEI). The two companies' brand identities were maintained until the 1960's until, soon after 1967, the holding company, AEI, was taken over by one of the UK's biggest companies, the General Electric Company (GEC), which is distinct from — and should never be confused with — the giant US company General Electric (GE). 

At Christmas time, for many years, there had been a public Christmas Lights Display on the site of the lamp factory.

The site of the former Thorn Lighting factory is now occupied by a Sainsbury’s Supermarket. There is now a large metallic tree built opposite the former site on the corner of Melton Road and Troon Way called The World Tree, there being a map of the world on the base of the tree. This was built in honour of the former factory.

Demographics
Like neighbouring Belgrave, Rushey Mead has a large Asian population.

As of the 2011 Census

The population of Rushey Mead was 15,962 and was made up of approximately 51% females and 49% males.

The average age of people in Rushey Mead is 39, while the median age is lower at 38.

53.9% of people living in Rushey Mead were born in England. Other top answers for country of birth were 18.7% India, 6.6% Kenya, 1.7% Sri Lanka, 1.2% Africa not otherwise specified, 1.0% Pakistan, 0.5% Ireland, 0.4% Zimbabwe, 0.4% Scotland, 0.3% Somalia.

61.0% of people living in Rushey Mead speak English. The other top languages spoken are 23.6% Gujarati, 5.5% Punjabi, 1.8% Tamil, 1.3% Polish, 0.9% Urdu, 0.9% Slovak, 0.9% South Asian Language, 0.5% Portuguese, 0.4% Hindi.

The religious make up of Rushey Mead is 43.1% Hindu, 21.7% Christian, 10.5% Muslim, 9.8% Sikh, 9.2% No religion, 0.3% Buddhist, 0.1% Jewish. 668 people did not state a religion. 18 people identified as Jedi knights and 2 people said they believe in Heavy Metal.

54.2% of people are married, 5.4% cohabit with a member of the opposite sex, 0.4% live with a partner of the same sex, 24.5% are single and have never married or been in a registered same sex partnership, 6.0% are separated or divorced. There are 552 widowed people living in Rushey Mead.

The top occupations listed by people in Rushey Mead are Process, plant and machine operatives 15.0%, Administrative and secretarial 13.6%, Elementary 13.3%, Sales and customer service 12.2%, Administrative 11.3%, Process, plant and machine operatives 10.9%, Professional 10.6%, Skilled trades 10.0%, Elementary administration and service 9.5%, Sales 9.4%.

Education

Schools in the area
Primary schools: Wyvern Primary, Herrick Primary, Sandfield Primary and Rushey Mead Primary.

Secondary schools: Rushey Mead Academy, which is the best state-funded secondary school in Leicester and Leicestershire  and Soar Valley College.

The World Tree

Located in Rushey Mead, on the corner of Melton Road and Troon Way, is a 5m high steel tree sculpture with bronze light bulbs on the branches. It stands opposite the former site of the GE-Thorn Lighting factory, which a Sainsbury's supermarket now occupies. It cost £62,000 and was paid for by Sainsbury's. It was unveiled on the 4th of March 2016 by the Speaker of the House of Commons John Bercow in the attendance of Mayor of Leicester Peter Soulsby and Leicester East MP Keith Vaz.

Places of Interest
Watermead Country Park - a network of artificial lakes with a large statue of a mammoth atop a hill.

Scenery
The River Soar runs along the west of Rushey Mead and up to Watermead Country Park.

Area
The electoral ward of Rushey Mead contains parts of the neighbouring area and suburb of Belgrave meaning that despite the actual geographical location that specific area may also be classed as being in Rushey Mead by virtue of the electoral ward mapping.

Shopping
There is a large Sainsbury’s supermarket on Melton Road including a garage and café.

Transport

Major Roads
Rushey Mead is located on the A607 road and the A563 road.

Bus
First Leicester service 4 serves Rushey Mead on Glenagles Avenue and Trevino Drive and Arriva Midlands services 5, 5A and 6 all serve Rushey Mead along the A607.

All bus services operate along the Golden Mile from and into Leicester City Centre.

The nearest bus stations, both in Leicester City Centre are the Haymarket and St Margaret's.

Train
The nearest train stations are Leicester railway station and Syston railway station.

The Midland Main Line runs along at the east of Rushey Mead.

Airport

Politics
Rushey Mead is located within the Leicester East parliament constituency, a seat held by the Labour Party consistently since 1987 albeit with a significantly reduced majority in the 2019 United Kingdom general election, though reflecting a widespread national trend for the Labour Party in that particular election.

The electoral ward of Rushey Mead includes parts of the neighbouring suburb and Leicester area of Belgrave.

Rushey Mead is represented on Leicester City Council by Labour Councillors Ross Willmott, a former leader of the city council and the Labour Party candidate for Leicestershire Police and Crime Commissioner, Piara Singh Clair MBE, the deputy city mayor and cabinet member for Culture, Leisure, Sport and Regulatory Services and Rita Patel, the assistant city mayor and cabinet member for Equalities and Special Projects and founder of the Peepul Centre, located in the neighbouring area of Belgrave and close to Leicester City Centre.

Rushey Mead was represented within the East Midlands parliamentary constituency in the European Parliament.

Council election results

Rushey Mead 2019

Rushey Mead 2015

Sport
Highfield Rangers F.C.  is based in Rushey Mead.

Notable people
Actresses Parminder Nagra and Rakhee Thakrar went to Soar Valley College within Rushey Mead.

References

External links

 Rushey Mead Foundation - Charity linked to Rushey Mead School
Curve Theatre - Fashioning a City - Rushey Mead

Areas of Leicester